Damián Andrés Frascarelli Gutiérrez (born 2 June 1985), known as Damián Frascarelli, is a Uruguayan goalkeeper who currently plays for S.D. Aucas on loan from Guayaquil City.

Notes

External links
 
 

1985 births
Living people
Uruguayan footballers
Uruguayan expatriate footballers
Miramar Misiones players
Central Español players
C.A. Cerro players
APOP Kinyras FC players
AC Omonia players
C.A. Bella Vista players
Club Atlético River Plate (Montevideo) players
Ñublense footballers
Peñarol players
Guayaquil City F.C. footballers
Barcelona S.C. footballers
S.D. Aucas footballers
Uruguayan Primera División players
Chilean Primera División players
Cypriot First Division players
Ecuadorian Serie A players
Uruguayan people of Italian descent
Association football goalkeepers
Uruguayan expatriate sportspeople in Chile
Uruguayan expatriate sportspeople in Cyprus
Uruguayan expatriate sportspeople in Ecuador
Expatriate footballers in Chile
Expatriate footballers in Cyprus
Expatriate footballers in Ecuador